Mister Maker is a British children's television series produced by RDF Media (Series 1)/The Foundation (Series 2-3) for CBeebies. The series ran from September 2007 until December 2009, with 60 episodes produced within three series. Mister Maker's Arty Party is also available on BBC iPlayer for over a year.

It was followed up with four spin-offs:  Mister Maker Comes to Town, Mister Maker Around the World, Mister Maker's Arty Party, and Mister Maker at Home, which began airing in 2010, 2013, 2015 and 2020, respectively.

About
Mister Maker is an arts and crafts series featuring the titular "Mister Maker", portrayed by Phil Gallagher, who also created and narrated the series. The series is formatted into different sequences:
 Creative Idea - Mister Maker shows off a different make.
 The Shapes Dance (or "I Am a Shape") - The Shapes dance to their own song - "I Am a Shape", before one of them presents a shape puzzle.
 Make It in a Minute - Tocky the Bird informs Mister Maker when this segment starts, and when he does, he makes a simple make in a minute. It is similar to the "1 Minute Finger Tips" segment from fellow-Foundation production Finger Tips.
 The Colour Kids - Various children wearing different coloured clothes create a picture using different motions of their body.
 Frame-It! - A more relaxing segment that can be put over a frame. This segment is narrated over by Mister Maker.
 Random Picture - A segment that varies on every episode, which can either be a messy picture or pictures made by objects.
 Another Creative Idea - Mister Maker shows off another make.

The show ends with Tocky telling Mister Maker to go and then shows him "putting away all this stuff back in its box" (meaning the studio's objects are to be put away).

Development and Broadcast
Mister Maker was commissioned by Michael Carrington at the BBC for CBeebies. The series launched in 2007 and also aired on BBC One and BBC Two. In the United States and Latin America the series was broadcast on the Discovery Familia network, dubbed in Spanish and in Portuguese in Brazil. In Canada, the series aired on Treehouse TV from 2008 to 2012 and TVOKids from 2013 to 2021. The Foundation (part of RDF Media) commissioned the series for three seasons. It also aired in Australia on ABC2. The series comprises a mixture of animation, CGI and live-action.

Episodes

Series 1 (2007)

Awards and nominations
 BAFTA: Nominated for Best Presenter (Phil Gallagher/Mister Maker)

DVD 
Various DVDs of the series were released by 2entertain, and later Abbey Home Media.

Live shows 
Mister Maker Live (2014-2015)
Mister Maker And The Shapes Live (2014-2017)
Mister Maker Hide and Seek Party (2018)
Mister Maker Returns (2018-2019)
Mister Maker And Rebecca Keatley (2020-2021)
Make it Mister Maker (2020-2021)
Mister Maker At The Marlowe (2021) 
Mister Maker Club (2021)

References

External links

2007 British television series debuts
2009 British television series endings
2000s British children's television series
2000s preschool education television series
BBC children's television shows
British preschool education television series
British television shows featuring puppetry
CBeebies
English-language television shows
Television series about art
Television series by Banijay
Treehouse TV original programming